Ynysybwl Athletic A.F.C. was a Welsh football club from the village of Ynysybwl in Cwm Clydach in Wales and forms part of the community of Ynysybwl and Coed-y-cwm.
.The club played for 25 seasons in the Welsh Football League, before in the early 1990s merging with Pontypridd. After reforming, the club played in the Taff Ely & Rhymney Valley Alliance League and finished as champions in the 2018–19 season, their third title in four years in that division.

History
There is evidence of the club playing in the Welsh Football League in the 1920s and again for two seasons in the post-war period. They rejoined the league in the 1967–68 season and over the next twenty years fluctuated between the second and third tiers of the Welsh League. Promotion to the top flight was secured in 1989 and after a campaign at that level the club merged with Pontypridd Social Club to become Pontypridd-Ynysybwl. A year later, Ynysybwl was removed entirely from the club's identity as Pontypridd Town were formed.

The club reformed in the 2010s and played in the Taff Ely & Rhymney Valley Alliance League. Their first season in Division One in 2014–15 saw them finish fourth with the following season they moved up to the Premier Division, winning the first of their three titles in four years in that division (the fourth year they finished on equal points with the winners, losing out for the title only on goal difference.) At the end of the 2018–19 season the club again won the tile, but lost to Maesteg Park in the South Wales Alliance League promotion play-off final. Later that summer the club withdrew from the 2019–20 season.

Honours

Welsh Football League Division Two (Tier 3 of the Welsh Football pyramid) – Champions: 1968–69
Welsh Football League Division One (Tier 3 of the Welsh Football pyramid) - Runners-Up: 1988–89
Taff Ely & Rhymney Valley Alliance League Premier League – Champions:  2015–16; 2016–17; 2018–19
Taff Ely & Rhymney Valley Alliance League Premier League – Runners-Up: 2017–18
Taff Ely & Rhymney Valley Alliance League Division One – Champions: 2021–22

Welsh Football League history
Information sourced from the Football Club History Database for Ynysbwl Athletic and Pontypridd-Ynysybwl, and the Welsh Soccer Archive.

Notes

References

External links
Official club Twitter

Football clubs in Wales
Welsh Football League clubs
Taff Ely & Rhymney Valley Alliance League clubs
Sport in Rhondda Cynon Taf